Pierre Daret de Cazeneuve, a French portrait painter and engraver, was born in Paris in 1604. After receiving some instruction in engraving, he went to Rome to improve his skill, and spent a considerable time there. He was received into the Academy of Painting in 1663.

He died at the château of La Luque, near Dax (Landes) in 1678. Mariette says that this artist began and finished his career with painting. He engraved upwards of four hundred plates, not without merit, but very deficient in taste and correctness of drawing. They are frequently marked and among them are the following:

Portraits
Bust of Alexander the Great.
Pope Alexander VII.
Charles I, king of Great Britain.
Henri de Bourbon, Prince of Condé.
Charlotte Marguerite de Montmorency, Princess of Condé.
Marguerite Gaston, Duchess of Orleans.
Vladislas IV, King of Poland.

Subjects after various masters
St. John sitting in the Desert with his Lamb; after Guido.
The Virgin suckling the Infant; after A. Carracci.
St. Peter delivered from Prison; after Domenichino.
The Entombment of Christ; after Barocci.
A Holy Family, with Angel presenting fruit to the Infant Jesus; after S. Vouet.
The Dead Christ, with the Marys; after the same.
St. Jerome; half-length; after Blanchard.
Thetis ordering Vulcan to forge arms for Achilles; after the same.
A Charity with five Children; after the same.
The Visitation of the Virgin to St. Elizabeth; after Corneille.
The Virgin and Infant; after Sarazin.

He also engraved one hundred small plates for a work entitled, 'La Doctrine des Moeurs,' after the designs of Otto van Veen, 1646; his engravings are mirror-image close copies of the van Veen engravings. He also produced a great number of portraits for a publication entitled, 'Tableaux historiques, où sont graves les illustres Prancois et Etrangers de I'un et 1' autre sexe; par Pierre Daret, Louis Boissevin, et B. Moncomet,' published in 1652 and 1656.

There was also a Pierre Daret, a painter upon vellum and in water-colours, who was living in 1664.

References

External links
 

1604 births
1678 deaths
17th-century French engravers
17th-century French painters
French male painters
French portrait painters
Painters from Paris